Aplocnemus alpestris is a species of soft-winged flower beetles belonging to the family Rhadalidae.

Distribution
This species is present in Central and Southern Europe (Andorra, Austria, Czech Republic, France, Italy, Slovakia, Spain and Switzerland) and in the eastern Palearctic realm (southern Siberia, northeast Kazakhstan, southern Altai, Mounts Ulbinski).

Habitat

Description
These soft-winged flower beetles have an elongated, cylindrical body. Pronotum and elytra have a slightly shiny black color. They are coarsely punctuated, with a long grayish pubescence. The antennae show a sexual dimorphism in their structure, as in males they are deeply serrated, while they are shallowly serrated in females.

Biology
Adults can be found from July to September.

References 

Beetles of Europe
Beetles described in 1861